Antonio Garcia Martinez (born 24 December 1956 in Sevilla) is a Spanish cyclist. He is LC3 type cyclist. He is a chemical engineer. He competed at the 1996 Summer Paralympics, the 2000 Summer Paralympics, the 2004 Summer Paralympics, and the 2008 Summer Paralympics. He finished first in the Combined Road (Pursuit / Time Trial) LC3 race.

References

External links 
 
 

1956 births
Living people
Spanish male cyclists
Paralympic cyclists of Spain
Paralympic gold medalists for Spain
Paralympic medalists in cycling
Cyclists at the 1992 Summer Paralympics
Cyclists at the 1996 Summer Paralympics
Cyclists at the 2000 Summer Paralympics
Cyclists at the 2004 Summer Paralympics
Cyclists at the 2008 Summer Paralympics
Medalists at the 1992 Summer Paralympics
Medalists at the 2004 Summer Paralympics
Sportspeople from Seville
Cyclists from Andalusia